Barry Douglas Lane (21 June 1960 – 31 December 2022) was an English professional golfer. He won five official European Tour events between 1988 and 2004. He played in the 1993 Ryder Cup and won the inaugural Andersen Consulting World Championship of Golf in late 1995. After reaching 50 he had considerable success on the European Senior Tour, winning eight times between 2010 and 2019.

Early life
Lane was born in Hayes, Middlesex but grew up in Bracknell. He only took up golf at the age of 14 but became an assistant professional at nearby Downshire Golf Club in 1976, at the age of 16. He was an assistant at Downshire for 8 years.

Professional career
Lane first played on the European Tour in 1982, after three failed attempts at Q-School. From 1982 to 1984 he had little success on the tour, playing only a small number of events, and failed to qualify for the tour in 1985. He did have some success in non-tour events, winning the 1983 PGA Assistants' Championship at Coombe Hill. The win earned him a place in the World Assistants' Championship in Florida in December, which he won by 6 strokes.

Lane qualified for the European Tour again in 1986 and, playing 20 events, finished 71st in the Order of Merit. He improved again in 1987, finishing 27th in the Order of Merit with five top-10 finishes. In October 1987 he also had his biggest prize to date, £20,000, for winning the inaugural Equity & Law Challenge, an unofficial money event on the tour. Lane won the 36-hole event, in which points were gained for birdies and eagles, with a score of 15, one ahead of Bill Malley.

Lane played 26 successive seasons, from 1986 to 2011, on the European Tour. Lane's best years came in the early to mid-nineties, when he made the top ten of the Order of Merit three times, with a best of fifth in 1992. He won four European Tour events between 1988 and 1994. He had a relatively bad period in his later thirties, but after the turn of the millennium his form improved again and he picked up his fifth win on the Tour at the 2004 Daily Telegraph Damovo British Masters.

Lane won several professional tournaments not on the European Tour, most lucratively the 1995 Andersen Consulting World Championship of Golf. This event was a precursor of the WGC-Accenture Match Play Championship and Lane's prize was US$1,000,000, which was a rare level of prize in golf at that time.

Lane made his only Ryder Cup appearance in Europe's home defeat at The Belfry in 1993, losing all three of his matches. He represented England in the World Cup and the Alfred Dunhill Cup several times and played for the Rest of the World Team in the UBS Cup three times.

On turning 50 in June 2010, Lane joined the European Senior Tour. He quickly claimed his first win at the Cleveland Golf/Srixon Scottish Senior Open that August. Lane continued his good form in 2011, playing a mixture of regular and senior European Tour events, and winning twice more on the senior tour. Subsequently he enjoyed further wins on the 2012, 2016, 2017 tours and twice on 2019 circuit.

Death
Lane died of cancer on 31 December 2022, at the age of 62.

Professional wins (20)

European Tour wins (5)

European Tour playoff record (0–3)

Other wins (6)
1983 Footjoy PGA Assistants' Championship, Jamaica Open, Footjoy World Assistants' Championship
1987 Equity & Law Challenge
1995 Andersen Consulting World Championship of Golf
2015 Farmfoods British Par 3 Championship

European Senior Tour wins (8)

European Senior Tour playoff record (1–1)

Japan PGA Senior Tour wins (1)
2018 Fujifilm Senior Championship

Results in major championships

CUT = missed the halfway cut
"T" indicates a tie for a place.

Source:

Summary

Most consecutive cuts made – 6 (1991 Open Championship – 1993 PGA)
Longest streak of top-10s – 0

Results in World Golf Championships

"T" = Tied

Team appearances
Dunhill Cup (representing England): 1988, 1994, 1995, 1996
World Cup (representing England): 1988, 1994
Ryder Cup (representing Europe): 1993
UBS Cup (representing the Rest of the World): 2002, 2003 (tie), 2004

See also
List of golfers with most European Senior Tour wins

References

External links

English male golfers
European Tour golfers
European Senior Tour golfers
PGA Tour Champions golfers
Ryder Cup competitors for Europe
People from Hayes, Hillingdon
1960 births
2022 deaths